YBC 7289 is a Babylonian clay tablet notable for containing an accurate sexagesimal approximation to the square root of 2, the length of the diagonal of a unit square. This number is given to the equivalent of six decimal digits, "the greatest known computational accuracy ... in the ancient world". The tablet is believed to be the work of a student in southern Mesopotamia from some time between 1800 and 1600 BC. It was donated to the Yale Babylonian Collection by J. P. Morgan.

Content 

The tablet depicts a square with its two diagonals. One side of the square is labeled with the sexagesimal number 30. The diagonal of the square is labeled with two sexagesimal numbers. The first of these two, 1;24,51,10 represents the number 305470/216000 ≈ 1.414213, a numerical approximation of the square root of two that is off by less than one part in two million. The second of the two numbers is 42;25,35 = 30547/720 ≈ 42.426. This number is the result of multiplying 30 by the given approximation to the square root of two, and approximates the length of the diagonal of a square of side length 30.

Because the Babylonian sexagesimal notation did not indicate which digit had which place value, one alternative interpretation is that the number on the side of the square is 30/60 = 1/2. David Fowler and Eleanor Robson write, "Thus we have a reciprocal pair of numbers with a geometric interpretation…". They point out that, while the importance of reciprocal pairs in Babylonian mathematics makes this interpretation attractive, there are reasons for skepticism.

The reverse side is partly erased, but Robson believes it contains a similar problem concerning the diagonal of a rectangle whose two sides and diagonal are in the ratio 3:4:5.

Interpretation 
Although YBC 7289 is frequently depicted (as in the photo) with the square oriented diagonally, the standard Babylonian conventions for drawing squares would have made the sides of the square vertical and horizontal, with the numbered side at the top. The small round shape of the tablet, and the large writing on it, suggests that it was a "hand tablet" of a type typically used for rough work by a student who would hold it in the palm of his hand. The student would likely have copied the sexagesimal value of the square root of 2 from another tablet, but an iterative procedure for computing this value can be found in another Babylonian tablet, BM 96957 + VAT 6598.

The mathematical significance of this tablet was first recognized by Otto E. Neugebauer and Abraham Sachs in 1945.
The tablet "demonstrates the greatest known computational accuracy obtained anywhere in the ancient world", the equivalent of six decimal digits of accuracy. The same number  can also be used in the interpretation of certain ancient Egyptian calculations of the dimensions of pyramids. However, the much greater numerical precision of the numbers on YBC 7289 makes it more clear that they are the result of a general procedure for calculating them, rather than merely being an estimate.

Ptolemy did not explain where this approximation came from and it may be assumed to have been well known by his time.

Provenance and curation 
It is unknown where in Mesopotamia YBC 7289 comes from, but its shape and writing style make it likely that it was created in southern Mesopotamia, sometime between 1800BC and 1600BC. Yale University acquired it in 1909 as a donation from the estate of J. P. Morgan, who had collected many Babylonian tablets; his bequest became the Yale Babylonian Collection.

At Yale, the Institute for the Preservation of Cultural Heritage has produced a digital model of the tablet, suitable for 3D printing.

See also

Plimpton 322
IM 67118

References 

Babylonian mathematics
Mathematics manuscripts
Clay tablets
18th-century BC works